Steacy may refer to:

 Ashley Steacy (born 1987), Canadian rugby union player
 Brendan Steacy (born 19??), Canadian cinematographer
 Harold Robert Steacy (born 1923), Canadian mineralogist
 Heather Steacy (born 1988), Canadian hammer thrower
 James Steacy (born 1984), Canadian hammer thrower
 Ken Steacy (born 1955), Canadian comic artist
 Newton Phillips Steacy (1896–1969), Canadian politician
 Will Steacy (born 1980), American writer and photographer

See also
 Stacy (disambiguation)
 Steacyite